This is a list of museums in Panama.

See also 
 List of museums by country

References

External links 
 http://www.panama-museums.com

Panama
 
Museums
Panama
Museums